Florin Zamfirescu (born 12 April 1949) is a Romanian theatre and film actor and director, and university professor.

Zamfirescu was born in Călimănești, Vâlcea County; his grandfather, Gheorghe Zamfirescu, was mayor of the town. He graduated from the Caragiale National University of Theatre and Film in Bucharest in 1971. From 1971 to 1973, he was an actor in the Municipal Theatre of Târgu Mureș, and subsequently moved to the Odeon Theatre in Bucharest. From 1974 to 1978 he was an instructor Caragiale National University; in 1996 he became a professor, and from 2000 to 2008 he served as rector of the university. In 2002 he received Ph.D. in Arts, with thesis "Acting or Magic". In 2014 he was let go from the Odeon Theatre by its director, .

Filmography  
 Meda or the Not So Bright Side of Things (2017) – Pandele  
  (2018) – Stan Țugurlan
 Meda (2016)
 10 Hours (2015)
  (2015) – The father  
 Back Home (2015) – Robert's father
  (2015)  
 Kira Kiralina (2014) – Ilie  
 Happy Funerals (2013) – Beggar  
 Child's Pose (2013) – Aurelian Făgărășanu  
 Killing Time (2012) – The old man  
 Narcisa sălbatică (2011) – Narcisa's father
 Iubire și onoare (2010) – Said bin Faisal
 Aniela (2009) – Haralamb
 Weekend with my Mother (2009) – Felix  
 Regina (2008)
 Restul e tăcere (2008) – Colonel Guță  
 Inimă de țigan (2007) – Gigi Dumbravă
 Cum mi-am petrecut sfârșitul lumii (2006) – School's principal  
 Iubire ca în filme (2006) – Spiridon
 Femeia visurilor (2005) – Cratofil  
 The Death of Mr. Lazarescu (2005) – Dr. Ardelean  
 Estul salbatic (2004)
 Nepoții lui Adam (2004) – Narrator
 Orient Express (2004) - Take Criveanu
 Rivoglio i miei figli / Totul pentru copiii mei (2004)
 Sindromul Timișoara – Manipularea (2004)
 Ultimul stinge lumina (2004) – Niță Snae
 Dulcea saună a morții (2003) – Mangiurea
 Maria (2003) – Ahmed
 ...Sub clar de lună (2002)
 Al matale, Caragiale (2002)
 Filantropica (2002) – Poetul Garii de Nord
 Detectiv fără voie (2001)
 Netsuke (2001)
 Don Juan sau dragostea pentru pentru geometrie (1997)
 Don Carlos (1996)
 Transfer de personalitate (1996)
 Mincinosul (1995)
 Senatorul melcilor (1995)
 Im Zeichen der Liebe (1994)
 E pericoloso sporgersi (1993) – Service officer
 Inelul cu briliant (1993)
 Dragoste și apă caldă (1992) – Emil, engineer and taxi driver
 Șobolanii roșii (1991) – Securitate officer
 Marea sfidare (1989)
 Danga langa / (1988) – autorul poeziei
 De ce are vulpea coadă? (1988)
 Iacob (1988) – Covaci
 Nelu (1988)
 The Moromete Family (1987) – Țugurlan
 Cale liberă (1986)
 Pădurea de fagi (1986)
 Întunecare (1985)
 Năpasta (1985)
 Lumini și umbre: Partea II (1982)
 Pădurea nebună (1982) – Darie
 Ramân cu tine (1982) – Machidon
 De ce trag clopotele, Mitică? (1981) – Un catindat de la Percepție
 Lumini și umbre: Partea I  (1981)
 Un echipaj pentru Singapore (1981) – Captain Mărgineanu
 Cumpăna (1979)
 Iarba verde de acasă (1978)
 Înainte de tăcere (1978) – Servant Petre
 Frunze care ard (1977)
 Dincolo de pod (1976) – Trica
 Tănase Scatiu (1976)
 Mere roșii (1975) – Gică
 Actorul și sălbaticii (1975)
 Tatăl risipitor (1974) – Railwayman Zamfir
 Rate cu repetiție (1973) – Soldier Popescu
 Așteptarea (1970)

References

1949 births
Living people
People from Călimănești
Romanian male film actors
Romanian male stage actors
20th-century Romanian male actors
21st-century Romanian male actors
Caragiale National University of Theatre and Film alumni
Recipients of the National Order of Merit (Romania)
Rectors of universities in Romania
Recipients of the Order of Cultural Merit (Romania)